Edward David Moulton (born 8 February 1936 in Surrey, England) is a retired custom bicycle frame builder.

Dave Moulton studied at Luton Technical College in England and learned bicycle frame building from Albert "Pop" Hodge in Luton, beginning in 1957. He opened a frame-building business around 1975 in Worcester, England. In 1976, Paul Carbutt rode one of Moulton's bicycles in the Olympics in Montreal, Quebec, Canada. The bike frames were marked with Moulton's name, "Dave Moulton" in large lower-case letters.

Moulton began receiving orders from the United States due to the increasing popularity of cycling as a sport and the scarcity of master frame-builders there. Moulton emigrated to the United States in 1979 and went to work for Vic and Mike Fraysse in Ridgefield Park, New Jersey. He built bicycles for them under the Paris Sport brand that were used by the US Olympic Cycling Team. In 1980 he went to work for Masi Bicycles in California until 1981. Shortly thereafter he rented space from Masi to start his own frame-building business. By 1983 he was doing well enough to move his business to a stand-alone location in San Marcos, California. That year he went into partnership with Olympic cyclist John Howard and manufactured bicycle frames under the John Howard name until 1984. In 1984 he began making frames under the Fuso label (Fuso is the Italian word for Molten), and, between 1985 and 1987, a small number under the Recherché label. The bicycles sold from US$1,500 to $3,000 in the late 1980s.

Moulton retired from frame building in 1993. However, many of his bicycles are still in use. Moulton's bicycles have been ridden in more than 20 world championships, in major races including the Tour de France, and in Olympic events. The business was taken over by his former apprentice, Russ Denny, who still manufactures his own frames, plus under the Fuso name .

Moulton now lives in Easley, South Carolina with his second wife Kathy and has become a writer and songwriter. He published his first book in 2003, Prodigal Child.

References
Temecula Bike Maker Races Against Italian Counterparts, by Cheryle Besener. San Diego Business Journal, 8 May 1989, volume 9, issue 42, section 1, page 20.
Russ Denny Bicycles: Bike maker shifts into high gear, by Darla Martin Tucker. The Business Press, 15 January 2001, page 15.

1936 births
Living people
Bicycle framebuilders
British cycle designers
People from San Marcos, California